Shangolabad (also Romanized as Shangolābād; also known as Shangūlābād and Shankalābād) is a village in Abbas-e Sharqi Rural District of Tekmeh Dash District, Bostanabad County, East Azerbaijan province, Iran. At the 2006 census, its population was 393 in 81 households. The following census in 2011 counted 248 people in 75 households. The latest census in 2016 showed a population of 316 people in 99 households; it was the largest village in its rural district.

References 

Bostanabad County

Populated places in East Azerbaijan Province

Populated places in Bostanabad County